Sarah Hall (born 1972), best known under the pseudonym Sarah Vaughan, is a British writer and journalist. Until 2008, she worked for The Guardian as a senior reporter, health correspondent, and political correspondent.

She published her first book in 2014. As a novelist, Hall is known for a number of psychological thrillers which often deal with themes such as power and privilege, and the pressures placed on women. Many of her novels have been translated and were successful internationally. Her third novel, Anatomy of a Scandal, has been adapted for television. (2022).

Early life, education and early career
Vaughan was born Sarah Hall in 1972, and was brought up in Devon. She read English at Brasenose College, Oxford. After graduating, she started work as a journalist. She worked for The Guardian for eleven years as a senior reporter, health correspondent and political correspondent. In 2008, she left The Guardian and continued as a freelance reporter.

Writer
Using the pseudonym Sarah Vaughan, she published her first novel The art of baking blind in 2014, following a commitment she made on her 40th birthday to write a novel, and find a publisher for it, within a year. The book is about the participants in a baking competition, and was translated into six languages. It was followed two years later by The farm at the edge of the world (2016), which was especially successful in France.

She became known to a wider audience with her third novel Anatomy of a Scandal (2018), a political thriller about a junior government minister accused of rape. She has said that she used her experiences as a political reporter, and as an Oxford student, to explore themes such as power, privilege, and consent. Anatomy of a Scandal received positive reviews, and was in the Sunday Times bestseller list for ten weeks. It was translated into 22 languages and was listed as one of the best novels of the 2010s by Richard and Judy's Book Club. In 2020, Netflix commissioned a mini-series based on the novel, which premiered in April 2022.

Vaughan's next book, Little Disasters (2020), has been described as "a novel about motherhood and madness" and deals with child abuse, postnatal anxiety and maternal OCD. Although it did not have the same level of success as Anatomy of a Scandal, Vaughan was praised for the way she handled the topic of female mental health. The production company Rough Cut TV has taken an option on the book's film rights.

Her fifth novel, Reputation, was published in March 2022. It deals with the threats routinely received by women in public life, and social media bullying of young women and girls. The novel received mainly positive reviews, especially for providing an intelligent focus on the harassment of women. It has been optioned for television.

Bibliography 

 The art of baking blind. 2014
 The farm at the edge of the world. 2016
 Anatomy of a scandal. 2018
 Little disasters. 2020
 Reputation. 2022

References 

Alumni of Brasenose College, Oxford
Living people
21st-century British novelists
British women journalists
20th-century British journalists
21st-century British journalists
British women novelists
1972 births